Adamo Scultori (c.1530 – 1585), also referred to as Adamo Ghisi, was an Italian engraver, sculptor and artist.

Scultori was born in Mantua. He came from an artistic family: his father Giovanni Battista Scultori and sister Diana Scultori were both artists. Because of his family's close association with the artist Giorgio Ghisi, his sister and he were sometimes referred to by the Ghisi surname. He died in 1585. Some of his works can be seen at the Cleveland Museum of Art. and the Slovak National Gallery.

References

Further reading
Paolo Bellini, L'Opera incisa di Adamo e Diana Scultori, Vicenza 1991
M. Bury, The Print in Italy 1550-1625, British Museum, London 2001, p. 233

1486 births
Italian engravers
1557 deaths
Artists from Mantua
Italian male sculptors
16th-century Italian sculptors
16th-century engravers
Sculptors from Lombardy